Dmitry Sergeyevich Izotov (born 14 April 1984) is a Russian professional association football coach and a former player. He is the goalkeepers' coach with FC Dynamo Moscow. He played as a goalkeeper.

Club career
He played 3 seasons in the Russian Football National League for 4 different teams.

External links
 
 

1984 births
Footballers from Moscow
Living people
Russian footballers
Association football goalkeepers
FC Torpedo Moscow players
FC Zvezda Irkutsk players
FC Dynamo Bryansk players
FC Baltika Kaliningrad players
FC Ufa players
FC Spartak-MZhK Ryazan players